Bernardo Rodríguez was a Cuban pitcher in the Negro leagues in the 1920s.

A native of Havana, Cuba, Rodríguez played for the Cuban Stars (East) in 1927. In four recorded appearances on the mound, he posted a 6.29 ERA over 24.1 innings.

References

External links
 and Seamheads

1904 births
Date of birth missing
Year of death missing
Place of death missing
Cuban Stars (East) players
Baseball pitchers
Baseball players from Havana